In epidemiology, data or facts about a population is called denominator data. Denominator data are independent of any specific disease or condition.  This name is given because in mathematical models of disease, disease-specific data such as the incidence of disease in a population, the susceptibility of the population to a specific condition, the disease resistance, etc. disease-specific variables are expressed as their proportion of some attribute of the general population, and hence appear as the numerator of the fraction or percentage being calculated, general data about the population typically appearing in the denominator; hence the term "denominator data."

In an epidemiological compartment model, for example, variables are often scaled to total population. The susceptible fraction of a population is obtained by taking the ratio of the number of people susceptible to the total population. Susceptibility to a disease may depend on other factors such as age or sex. Data about a population including age distribution, male/female ratios, and other demographic factors may be relevant as denominator data. Denominator data is not only limited to data describing human populations but also includes information about wild and domestic animal populations.

See also
 Incidence
 Cumulative incidence
 Prevalence
 Attributable risk

References

Epidemiology